Bath is an unincorporated community in the northern part of Bath Township, Summit County, Ohio, United States. It is centered at the intersection of Cleveland-Massillon and Ira roads. It was developed 'circa 1820.

A post office called Bath has been in operation since 1824. A variant name was "Hammond's Corners", for Jason Hammond, an early settler. Jeffrey Dahmer's family moved here in 1968, the house went up for sale in 2012.

References

Unincorporated communities in Summit County, Ohio
Populated places established in 1820
Unincorporated communities in Ohio